Epactionotus yasi is a species of armored catfish endemic to Argentina..

References

López, H.L., A.M. Miquelarena and J. Ponte Gómez, 2005. Biodiversidad y distribución de la ictiofauna Mesopotámica. Miscelánea 14:311-354. 

Otothyrinae
Catfish of South America
Fish of Argentina
Endemic fauna of Argentina
Taxa named by Jorge Rafael Casciotta
Taxa named by María de las Mercedes Azpelicueta
Taxa named by Adriana Edith Almirón
Fish described in 2004